In military terms, 95th Squadron or 95 Squadron may refer to:

In the United States Air Force:
95th Fighter Squadron
95th Airlift Squadron
95th Reconnaissance Squadron

In the Royal Air Force:
No. 95 Squadron RAF

See also
 95th Division (disambiguation)